Sestelan (also Romanized as Sesţelān) is a village in Gurab Pas Rural District, in the Central District of Fuman County, Gilan Province, Iran. At the 2006 census, its population was 301, in 72 families.

References 

Populated places in Fuman County